Beckville may refer to:

Beckville, Indiana, an unincorporated community
Beckville, Minnesota, an unincorporated community
Beckville, Piedmont, Missouri, a neighborhood
Beckville, Texas, a city